"Shine On, Harvest Moon" is a popular early-1900s song credited to the married vaudeville team Nora Bayes and Jack Norworth. It was one of a series of moon-related Tin Pan Alley songs of the era. The song was debuted by Bayes and Norworth in the Ziegfeld Follies of 1908 to great acclaim. It became a pop standard, and continues to be performed and recorded in the 21st century.

During the vaudeville era, songs were often sold outright, and the purchaser would be credited as the songwriter. John Kenrick's Who's Who in Musicals credits the song's writers as Edward Madden and Gus Edwards. However, David Ewen's All the Years of American Popular Music credits Dave Stamper, who contributed songs to 21 editions of the  Ziegfeld Follies and was Bayes' pianist from 1903 to 1908. Vaudeville comic Eddie Cantor also credited Stamper in his 1934 book Ziegfeld - The Great Glorifier.

The earliest commercially successful recordings were made in 1909 by Harry Macdonough and Elise Stevenson (Victor 16259), Ada Jones and Billy Murray (Edison 10134), Frank Stanley and Henry Burr (Indestructable 1075), and Bob Roberts (Columbia 668).

Lyrics

First verse

Chorus

Note: The months in the chorus have been sung in different orders.

The Ada Jones and Billy Murray recording linked on this article has it as April, January, Ju-u-une or July.

Flanagan and Allen, Moon Mullican, Mitch Miller and Leon Redbone used January, February, June or July.

Oliver Hardy, in his rendition from The Flying Deuces, used January, April, June or July.

Second verse

(repeat chorus)

Film and television connections
The song has had a long history with Hollywood movies. In 1932, animation great Dave Fleischer directed a short titled Shine On Harvest Moon. A 1938 Roy Rogers western was named after the song, as was a 1944 biographical film about Bayes and Norworth.

The song has been featured in dozens of movies, including Along Came Ruth (1933) and The Great Ziegfeld (1936). Laurel and Hardy performed a song-and-dance routine (Hardy singing and both dancing) to the song in their 1939 RKO film The Flying Deuces. The song was also featured in A Tree Grows in Brooklyn (1945), The Eddy Duchin Story (1956), and Pennies from Heaven (1978). There was also a popular British 1980s comedy drama called Shine on Harvey Moon. The song was featured in the 2013 video game BioShock Infinite. It was referenced by Don Rickles in the 1971 Friars Club roast of Jerry Lewis when he said, "Just hope and pray, Shine on Harvest Moon they know." In the 1952 I Love Lucy episode The Benefit, the song is referenced and the chorus is sung.  And Gidney and Cloyd the moon creatures performed the first line of the refrain on an episode of Rocky and His Friends in 1959–60. The song was also sung in the pilot episode of the Cartoon Network miniseries Over the Garden Wall. The Backyardigans episode "The Key to the Nile" featured a song called "Please and Thank You" to the tune of this song.

Other recordings
 1931 - by Ethel Waters.
 1931 – Art Gillham's piano recording of the song for Columbia (No. 2374D) on January 5, 1931 was praised by Walter Winchell
 1931 – Ruth Etting revived the song in the Ziegfeld Follies
 1931 – The Boswell Sisters recorded their own arrangement of the revived hit on August 27, 1931 for Brunswick Records (No. 6173).
 1933 – Kate Smith 
 1939 – Laurel and Hardy perform it in their film The Flying Deuces
 1949 – Vaughn Monroe on Victor 1705
 1950 – Chordettes on Columbia LP 6111 Harmony Time
 1951 – Jerry Gray and his orchestra (recorded August 24, Decca Records catalog number 27868)
 1954 –  John Serry Sr. and his accordion ensemble for RCA Thesaurus
 1955 – Four Aces "B" side to their #1 hit "Love Is a Many Splendored Thing"
 1955 – Moon Mullican performed the song live
 1957 – Bonnie Guitar on Dot LP 25069 Moonlight And Shadows
 1957 – Coleman Hawkins and Ben Webster both perform sax in a nearly five-minute jazz version on the album Coleman Hawkins Encounters Ben Webster
 1958 – Mitch Miller recorded it in a medley with "For Me and My Gal" on the album More Sing Along With Mitch
 1958 – William Frawley, who portrayed Fred Mertz on I Love Lucy, recorded the song as part of his LP homage to Vaudeville, Bill Frawley Sings the Old Ones
 1958 – Billy Vaughn on Dot LP 25156 Billy Vaughn Plays
 1960 – Jaye P. Morgan on MGM 12924
 1960 – Teresa Brewer on Coral LP 57329 Naughty Naughty Naughty
 1960 – Rosemary Clooney included in her album Rosie Solves the Swingin' Riddle!.
 1960 – Bing Crosby and Rosemary Clooney. They recorded the song in 1960 for use on their radio show and it was subsequently included in the CD Bing & Rosie - The Crosby-Clooney Radio Sessions (2010).
 1961 – Bing Crosby included the song in a medley on his album 101 Gang Songs (1961)
1961 - Isley Brothers with Ray Ellis & Orchestra
 1962 – Platters for their album Sing of Your Moonlight Memories.
 1963 – Nino Tempo and April Stevens on Atco LP 156 Deep Purple
 1964 – Allan Sherman parodied the song as "Shine On, Harvey Bloom" on his album For Swingin' Livers Only!
 1965 – Mance Lipscomb recorded the song live for Arhoolie Records on Texas Songster in a Live Performance
 1976 – Leon Redbone recorded the song for his album Double Time
 1989 – Eight-year-old Britney Spears sang a rendition of the song in her video audition for the Mickey Mouse Club.
 1992 – Kirsten Cooke and Arthur Bostrom perform it as the characters Michelle Dubois and Officer Crabtree in the sitcom 'Allo 'Allo! (Season 8 Episode 7). Carmen Silvera as Madame Edith also sings the number during the closing credits of the same episode.
 2005 – Bobby Bare recorded the song as part of his album The Moon was Blue
 2007 – Marah recorded the song for their EP, Can't Take It with You
 2012 – Lon Milo DuQuette recorded it along with 11 originals on Baba Lon II
 2017 – Mree recorded her own rendition of the song as "Harvest Moon"
Liza Minnelli  also performed the song many times as part of her repertoire, and it appears on several of her recordings.

References
Notes

1908 songs
1900s song stubs
Male–female vocal duets
Songs written by Jack Norworth
Kate Smith songs
Nora Bayes songs
Songs about the Moon